Benjamin Thomas may refer to:

 Benjamin Thomas (politician) (1813–1878), Massachusetts politician and judge
 Benjamin Thomas (industrialist) (1860–1914), American businessman and industrialist, founder of the Coca-Cola Bottling Company
 Ben Thomas (American football) (born 1961), American football player
 Ben Thomas (ice hockey) (born 1996), Canadian ice hockey player
 Sir Ben Bowen Thomas (1899–1977), civil servant and university president
 Ben Thomas (photographer) (born 1981), Australian photographer
 Benjamin P. Thomas (1902–1956), American historian and biographer of Abraham Lincoln
 Benjamin Thomas (cricketer) (born 1989), Indian cricketer
 Benjamin Thomas (cyclist) (born 1995), French cyclist
 Ben Thomas (rugby union) (born 1998), Welsh rugby union player
 Ben Thomas (rugby league) (born 1997), professional rugby league footballer
 Benny Ninja (née Benjamin Thomas), American vogue dancer and choreographer from the House of Ninja

See also

 Thomas (surname)